Run is the debut studio album from Australian electronic DJ and Producer Alison Wonderland. It was released on 20 March 2015 via EMI Music Australia. The album features 3 singles; "U Don't Know" featuring Wayne Coyne, "Run" and "Games".   A deluxe edition of the album featuring remixes of the four singles and her debut single "Get Ready", was released on 30 October 2015.

At the J Awards of 2015, the album was nominated for Australian Album of the Year.

Promotion
Alison Wonderland toured North America in 2015, including a set at Coachella.

The Hermitude remix of "Games" and the Dre Skull remix of "Games" which features Konshens were released as promotional singles for the album. In addition, "Run" appears on the soundtrack for the 2015 reboot of Need for Speed. During a string of interviews that occurred in March and April 2015 as part of promotion for Run, Wonderland said to The Vine that the final track on the standard edition of the album titled "Already Gone" featuring Brave and Lido could not be remixed due to co-producer Lido losing the project files and only having an MP3 for Wonderland to record her vocals over.

Singles
"U Don't Know" was released as the first single from Run and features Wayne Coyne from The Flaming Lips. The music video was released on 11 February 2015 which Co-Stars Christopher Mintz-Plasse. "Run", the title track of the album, was released as the second single on 11 June 2015. It was accompanied by a music video uploaded on the same day. The third and final single "Games" was released on 9 September 2015 which was accompanied with a one-take music video on the same day. A remix of "Games" by Hermitude was released for promotional purposes.

The two singles "I Want U" and "Cold" from her 2014 debut extended play Calm Down were included on the album.

While not released as an official single, a video for "Take It to Reality" featuring Safia was released in August 2015.

Critical reception

Run received generally positive reviews from critics. Dylan Stewart from The Music gave Run 4 out of 5 stars, stating; "Alison Wonderland's take on the modern electro genre throws any concept of subtlety out the window, a blessing considering the washed-out pretence with which some of her contemporaries (BANKS, Grimes, Sky Ferreira) flirt." Another positive review was given by Krystal Spence from YourEDM stating "Not all the tracks on Run could be technically classified as trap, but there are definitely a few that standout for their production value. "I Want U" has a dreamy intro that goes well with her falsetto signing before a much harder drop. There's also "Naked" with Slumberjack, which provides great contrast against her voice as well." She also said that; "Alison Wonderland proves her ability to diversify, that she's not just a one-trick pony. She has talent, lots of talent. Overall, Run is a smart debut album, capable of casting a big enough net to grow Alison Wonderland's fan base exponentially over the next few months."

In a more negative review, Everett True of The Guardian gave Run 1 out of 5 stars, stating "There's little funk, no real purpose.' as well as ' There are no dynamics, or very few. Just a load of EDM signifiers and tropes spiralling around in need of a hook." He complimented "I Want U" for its moments of bass pounding, but countered the compliment by saying the vocals are lacking.

Track listing
 refers to a remixer

Charts

Weekly charts

Year-end charts

Release history

References

2015 albums
Alison Wonderland albums